Sandars is a surname which may refer to:

Clare Sandars (born 1934), English former child actress
Joseph Sandars (1785-1860), English corn merchant and railway pioneer
Nancy Sandars (1914–2015), British archaeologist and prehistorian
Samuel Sandars (1837–1894), English bibliographer, barrister and university benefactor
Thomas Collett Sandars (1825–1894), English barrister
Tom Sandars (born 1976), British radio news reader and continuity announcer

See also
Sanders (disambiguation)